Portulacaria armiana (previously Ceraria armiana), also known as the whipstick-porkbush, is a succulent plant found on the border between Namibia and South Africa.

Description
It grows as a low shrub. It can be distinguished from its relatives by its large, grey-green waxy leaves, and its extremely tall inflorescence ("whipstick"), which rises unusually high (up to 8 meters).

Within the genus Portulacaria, it is most closely related to its sister-species Portulacaria namaquensis.

Distribution
Its natural habitat is the lower reaches of the Orange River valley, on the border between Namibia and South Africa. In this extremely arid, winter-rainfall area, it favours mildly acidic sands on high granite outcrops.

It grows in full sun in extremely well-drained soil, and can be propagated by seed or cuttings.

References

armiana
Flora of South Africa
Flora of Namibia